Wien Traisengasse is a railway station serving Brigittenau, the twentieth district of Vienna.

References

External links 
 

Traisengasse
Austrian Federal Railways